Karin Lin-Greenberg is an American fiction writer. Her story collection, Faulty Predictions (University of Georgia Press, 2014), won the 2013 Flannery O'Connor Award for Short Fiction and the 2014 Foreword Review  INDIEFAB Book of the Year Award (Gold Winner for Short Stories).  Her stories have appeared in The Antioch Review, Bellevue Literary Review, Berkeley Fiction Review, Epoch, Kenyon Review Online, New Ohio Review, The North American Review, and Redivider. She is currently an associate professor of English at Siena College in Loudonville, New York. She has previously taught at Missouri State University, The College of Wooster, and Appalachian State University. She earned an MFA in Fiction Writing from the University of Pittsburgh in 2006, an MA in Literature and Writing from Temple University in 2003, and a BA in English from Bryn Mawr College.

Published works

Books
Faulty Predictions, University of Georgia Press, (September 2014)

External links
 Karin Lin-Greenberg's Official Web Site

References

Living people
American fiction writers
Missouri State University faculty
College of Wooster faculty
Appalachian State University faculty
University of Pittsburgh alumni
Temple University alumni
Bryn Mawr College alumni
Year of birth missing (living people)